Bruno Anderson da Silva Sabino, known simply as Bruninho or Bruno Sabino; born 29 September 1989) is a Brazilian professional footballer who plays as a right winger.

Career

HB Køge
Bruninho signed a three-year contract with Danish 1st Division club HB Køge on 22 July 2014, becoming the fourth Brazilian player to join the club during the transfer window, besides Washington Brandão, Fernando and Kauê. He impressed during his season in the second tier of Danish football, scoring 11 goals for the club.

Nordsjælland
On 22 July 2015, Bruninho signed a three-year contract with Danish Superliga club Nordsjælland. There, he also had a strong start, scoring in five goals in his first five league appearances. He made a total of 16 appearances for the club, scoring nine goals.

Guangzhou R&F
After only six months at Nordsjælland, Bruninho moved to Chinese Super League club Guangzhou R&F on 13 January 2016. In August 2016, he returned to Denmark when he signed a one-year loan deal with Midtjylland. He left Guangzhou R&F in April 2018, where he became a free agent.

Lajeadense and Pelotas
On 24 September 2020, Bruninho signed with Campeonato Brasileiro Série D club Pelotas, after having been a free agent since the start of the COVID-19 pandemic, where he had played for Lajeadense in the Campeonato Gaúcho Série A2.

Return to HB Køge
On 31 May 2021, Bruninho made his return to HB Køge, signing a six-month deal with the club. His second spell with Køge was not successful, as he suffered a foot injury early on. As his contract expired in December 2021, he had made only three appearances for the club.

References

External links
 

1989 births
Living people
Association football forwards
Brazilian footballers
Brazilian expatriate footballers
Association football midfielders
Footballers from Porto Alegre
Clube Esportivo Lajeadense players
Associação Atlética Ponte Preta players
Esporte Clube Passo Fundo players
Nacional Futebol Clube players
Vitória F.C. players
Sociedade Esportiva e Recreativa Caxias do Sul players
HB Køge players
FC Nordsjælland players
FC Midtjylland players
Guangzhou City F.C. players
R&F (Hong Kong) players
Esporte Clube Pelotas players
Hong Kong Premier League players
Danish 1st Division players
Danish Superliga players
Expatriate footballers in Portugal
Expatriate men's footballers in Denmark
Expatriate footballers in China
Expatriate footballers in Hong Kong
Brazilian expatriate sportspeople in Portugal
Brazilian expatriate sportspeople in Denmark
Brazilian expatriate sportspeople in China
Brazilian expatriate sportspeople in Hong Kong
Campeonato Brasileiro Série D players